Hasbullah Awang (9 September 1952 – 12 February 2015) was a Malaysian sports commentator. He worked as a sports commentator for Astro Arena from January 2014 until his death in February 2015. Formerly, he was a sports commentator at Radio Television Malaysia.

Hasbullah started his career as a radio announcer on Radio 1 (now Radio Klasik FM). He also became an assistant to operate a special program for kids with Kak Yong. He is better known as a commentator for sports events at home and abroad. His popularity peaked during the football nation into the Semi-Pro era in the early 1990s. He also a narrator for the Malaysian film, Sumolah, directed by Afdlin Shauki.

He died at the age of 62 at the National Heart Institute of Malaysia in Kuala Lumpur due to heart complication. He was survived by his wife, Hazida Alang Ahmad, four daughters and seven grandchildren, and was buried at the Kota Kemuning Muslim Cemetery, Shah Alam.

On March 25, 2015, he was awarded the Anugerah Penghargaan Khas at the 2014 UM Sports Awards by the University of Malaya. His older daughter, Jojiana Hasbullah receive the award on behalf of her late father.

References

1952 births
2015 deaths
Sports commentators
Malaysian people of Malay descent
People from Perak
Malaysian radio announcers